Mary Sibande (born 11 April 1982) is a South African artist based in Johannesburg. Her art consists of sculptures, paintings, photography, and design. Sibande uses these mediums and techniques to help depict the human form and explore the construction of identity in a postcolonial South African context. In addition, Sibande focuses on using her work to show her personal experiences through Apartheid. Her art also attempts to critique stereotypical depictions of women, particularly black women.

Early life
Sibande was born in Barberton in apartheid South Africa and was raised by her grandmother. Her mother was a domestic worker herself, and her father was in the South African Army. She did not know her father when she was younger but got to know him when she was a teenager. Because her mother was a domestic worker she pays homage to domestic workers with her artworks. Artworks such as the ones from her exhibit, "Long Live the Dead Queen". Sibande would describe her childhood as being perfect; she states that "‘I had everything I needed, and I went to a good high school which was multiracial. Many families couldn’t afford to send their kids there but I was fortunate that my mum was able to. I guess that also pushed me in a certain direction."

Education
Sibande received her diploma in Fine Arts from the Technikon Witwatersrand in 2004. She obtained a B-tech degree from the University of Johannesburg in 2007. At first Sibande wanted to be a fashion designer and art was more of an afterthought. Her aspirations of being a fashion designer are still prominent throughout all of her works. The usage of fashion and design are all over and displayed beautifully throughout every single one of her sculptures. In 2001, Sibande moved in with her mother to Johannesburg where she was studied at Witwatersrand Technikon.

Career and work
Sibande has used her work to expose many different things, from postcolonial South Africa to stereotypes of women as well as stereotypes regarding black women in South Africa. Her work contains multiple types of mediums such as sculpture, photography, design, collage, and even theatrics. Sibande’s painting and sculpture uses the human form to explore the construction of identity in a postcolonial South African context, but also attempts to critique stereotypical depictions of women, particularly black women. She was the South African representative at the 45th 2011 Venice Biennale, and her work Long Live the Dead Queen was found in murals all over the city of Johannesburg in 2010.   In 2016, her work The Purple Shall Govern toured South Africa. Sibande has also used her artwork to focus on giving voiceless people their voice back. Some have even said that her work confronts the very inkling of a disempowered African female and that her work aims to crack the morse code associated with western ideals of beauty and how they can appeal to black women.

Design 
Sibande was determined to be a fashion designer and said, "There were no museums and galleries in the town I grew up in; that was foreign to me." Sibande has used her knowledge and love for design to incorporate in her works. She has focused her fashion design for every piece of wardrobe her sculptures wear. In her "Conversation with Madam CJ Walker" exhibit, her knowledge and skill of cloth and fashion design are apparent. Her design and fashion work are also very carefully thought about. The fabrics and color Sibande chooses to use have different meaning and impacts on her work. In a journal article for the UNISA and Durban Art Gallery article an author named Carol Brown spoke about the usage of fabric in Sibande's work. She states that "The fabric used to produce uniforms for domestic workers is an instantly recognizable sight in domestic spaces in South Africa, and by applying it to Victorian dress she attempts to make a comment about history of servitude and colonization as it relates to the present in terms of domestic relationships."

Photography 
Sibande has used photography to capture and construct her artworks. In 2013 she had seven enlarged photographs of her work displayed on the streets of French suburbs such as Ivry-sur-Seine, Vitry-sur-Seine and Choisy-le-Roi. Photography has not only played a big part on her big public displays but also in her day-to-day work. Sibande takes into consideration how her work will be photographed which is reflected in how she presents and structures her works and installations. Many of her shows include both a display of her sculptures as well as photographs she's taken of her work or installations.

Sculpture 
At first, she would make little figures out of clay and that was about the full extent of artworks at the time. In the end, she would with the art route; however, Sibande states, "...I can now marry the two worlds – fashion and fine art aren’t far off from each other." Later on Sibande background and knowledge with sculpture became an extensive one. With exhibits such as her "Long Live the Dead Queen Series" in 2013, one is able to see the beginning of her character "Sophie" who is one of her best known and reappearing character in her sculptures.
Sophie, the main feature in all of her works is a sculpture. Sophie is molded after Sibande herself and is like her alter-ego. Sibande's sculpture draws energy from the long history of female domestic workers, during the apartheid and post-apartheid. The sculpture, Sophie, attempts to critique the long history of oppression in South Africa, specifically regarding black women in South Africa.

Theatrics 
Sibande's work is well known for both her whimsy and theatrics. The theatrics of her work plays a big role in how she showcases and portrays her characters as well as her messages. In an article by Leora Farber the author makes an analysis that many other critiques have said, "Sibande’s theatrical quotations of the language of dress and use of dramatic poses may be related to photographic representations of the Victorian female hysteric in various stages of a hysterical attack, in that they both evoke a sense of excess." The use Sibande has for positioning her sculpture, in addition to all of the other components of her work are to evoke an impression on the viewer.

Sophie
Sophie has played a large role in Sibande's work. Sophie as previously mentioned is Sibande's alter-ego, she is a domestic worker who finds peace and an escape from servitude by dreaming of emancipating herself. The character is in an imaginary and dream-like world where she is finally free. Sophie's life is collected and presented through a series of human-scale sculptures, molded on Sibande herself. Sophie's working uniform is gradually transformed into the grand Victorian wear of the European elite. Placing Sophie in Victorian clothing comments on the restriction of women in these large, heavy and tightened-up dresses. Her dress is a protest against being a maid, and at the same time, it is the façade that allows her fantasies to come to life. Sophie starts to take different roles throughout Sibande's work in addition to being different types of people. In each work Sophie portrays different personas, one being a Victorian queen, another being a general who leads an entire army to victory, she's also a beautiful woman going to a ball and even a pope at one point. Sophie is portrayed as a hero and a character full of strength and perseverance.

Furthermore, Sibande takes Sophie into different exhibits throughout the years. She first portrays Sophie in her “Long Live the Dead Queen” exhibition from 2009 to 2013. "Long Live the Dead Queen" portray Sophie as a maid who is reclaiming who she post-colonialism. She is then brought back again in a different setting in “The Purple Shall Govern” in 2013–2017. This exhibit is when Sibande allows the "new" Sophie to come out and express herself. The exhibit takes a place of an installation which takes over the space. Sophie makes a reappearance with Sibande's most current series, “I Came Apart at the Seams” which takes place from 2019 to the present. Sophie is also depicted in a sculpture called Sophie/Elsie, which Sibande created in honor of her great-grandmother (a domestic worker whose masters gave her "Elsie" as a Western name).

Collections
Sibande's work is held in the following permanent collections:
 University of Michigan Museum of Art, Ann Arbor, MI
Toledo Museum of Art, Toledo, OH
 Spencer Museum of Art, Lawrence, KS
National Museum of African Art, Washington, DC

Solo exhibitions

 Sophie/Elsie | University of Michigan Museum of Art | Ann Arbor, Michigan | USA | 2021
I came apart at the seams | Somerset House | London, UK | 2019
 Leroy Neiman Gallery | New York City | USA | 2019
 A Crescendo of Ecstasy  | The Mixed Reality Workshop  (TMRW)  | Johannesburg, South Africa | 2018
 A Crescendo of Ecstasy | FNB Joburg Art Fair | Sandton Convention Centre | Johannesburg, South Africa | 2018
 Right Now! | Stellenbosch University's Woordfees Festival | Stellenbosch University's Art Museum | Stellenbosch, South Africa | 2016
 The Armory Show |  92 & 94 Piers | New York City, USA | 2016
 The Purple Shall Govern | Iziko South African National Gallery | Cape Town; Standard Bank Gallery, Johannesburg, South Africa | 2014
 Lyon Biennale of Contemporary Art | The Museum of Contemporary Art | Lyon, France | 2013
 The Purple Shall Govern | Grahamstown National Arts Festival | Grahamstown, South Africa | 2013
 The Purple Shall Govern | MAC/VAL Musée d’Art Contemporain di Val-de- Marne | Paris, France | 2013
 Mary Sibande and Sophie Ntombikayise Take Central Court | Central Court, Spencer Museum of Art | University of Kansas, Kansas, USA | 2012
 Long Live The Dead Queen | Inner City Johannesburg; Joburg City World Premier Annual Exhibition | Johannesburg; National Arts Festival, Grahamstown, South Africa | 2010

Group exhibitions

 Radical Revisionists: Contemporary African Artists Confronting Past and Present | Moody Center for the Arts, Houston, Texas | 2020
1-54 Contemporary African Art Fair (SMAC Gallery) | Somerset House, London, UK | 2019
 14th Curitiba International Biennale of Contemporary Art | Curitiba, Brazil | 2019
 N’GOLÁ Festival of Arts, Creation, Environment and Utopias | São Tomé e Príncipe | 2019
 FNB Art Joburg (SMAC Gallery) | Sandton Convention Centre | Johannesburg, South Africa | 2019
 Ampersand Foundation Award 21 years celebration exhibition | University of Johannesburg Art Gallery (JAG) | Johannesburg, South Africa | 2019
 Construction of the Possible | Havana Biennale | Havana, Cuba | 2019
 Made Visible | Contemporary South African Fashion and Identity | Boston Museum of Fine Art | Boston, USA | 2019
 A New Humanity | Dak’Art: African Contemporary Art Biennale | Dakar, Senegal | 2018
 Extra/Ordinary | Plugin New Media Section | Contemporary Istanbul | Istanbul, Turkey | 2018
 The Armory Show | Piers 92 & 94 | New York City, USA | 2018
 In Their Own Form | Museum of Contemporary Photography(MoCP) | Chicago, USA | 2018
 Shifting Boundaries: A Selection of Works showcasing South African Women Artists of the Past 100 Years | Welgemeend | Cape Town, South Africa | 2018
 Not a Single Story | Nirox Foundation Sculpture Park | Krugersdorp, South Africa | 2018
 Continental Drift: Black / black Art from South Africa and North Australia | Cairns Art Gallery | Cairns, Australia | 2018
 Like Life: Sculpture, Color, and the Body (1300–Now) | The Met Breuer | New York City, USA | 2018
 Cultural Threads | TextielMuseum | Tilburg, Netherlands | 2018
 Friends50 | Iziko South African National Gallery | Cape Town, South Africa | 2018
 African Mosaic: Selections from the Permanent Collection | National Museum of African Art | Smithsonian Institution | Washington, D.C, USA | 2017
 South Africa: The Art of a Nation | The British Museum | London, UK | 2017
 All things being equal | Zeitz Museum of Contemporary Art Africa (MOCAA) | Cape Town, South Africa | 2017
 Dress Code | Gallery MOMO | Cape Town, South Africa | 2017
 1:54 Contemporary African Art Fair | Somerset House, London, UK | 2017
 The Evidence of Things Not Seen | Johannesburg Art Gallery (JAG) | Johannesburg, South Africa | 2017
 Another Antipodes/Urban Axis | PS Art Space | Fremantle, Australia | 2017
 Beauty and Its Beasts | Durban Art Gallery | Durban, South Africa | 2017
 Different Angels | Höhenrausch Linz | Austria | 2017
 Re(as)sisting Narratives | Framer Framed | The Netherlands | 2016

Awards and distinctions

 In 2017 Smithsonian National Museum of African Arts Award 
 In 2014 Johannesburg Alumni Dignitas Award
 In 2013 Standard Bank Young Artist Award
She has also been a Smithsonian Fellow in Washington DC, a Ampersand Foundation Fellow in New York, and a Fellowship in the University of Michigan Fellowship. In 2018–19, Sibande was the Virginia C. Gildersleeve Professor at Barnard College.

References

1982 births
Living people
21st-century South African women artists
21st-century South African sculptors
21st-century women photographers
University of Johannesburg alumni
People from Barberton, Mpumalanga
South African women sculptors
South African women photographers